Allan McDougall (2 August 1857 – 14 October 1924) was an Australian politician. He was a Labor member of the Australian Senate from 1910 to 1919 and from 1922 until his death in 1924.

McDougall was born in Pyrmont, Sydney and received a primary education before undertaking a boilermaker apprenticeship with the Australasian Steam Navigation Company, later working at Mort's Dock. He was one of the first members of the United Society of Boilermakers and Iron Shipbuilders of New South Wales and was heavily involved in the union for many years, serving alternately as president and secretary at various times. He also served as secretary of the Eight Hours Day committee for ten years. A keen sportsman and footballer, he was also patron of the New South Wales League of Wheelmen (a cycling club) and the Glebe District Rugby League Football Club.

In 1910, he was elected to the Australian Senate as a member of the Labor Party. He was chairman of the Select Committee on Fitzroy Dock and a member of the Joint Committee on Public Accounts. In 1917, he was tried and acquitted for an alleged breach of the War Precautions Act after a speech regarding voting in the conscription referendum. He was defeated in 1919, but was re-elected in 1922. In 1923, he was a member of the Royal Commission on National Insurance. However, he died in office in 1924 from complications of diabetes; he had reportedly been in poor health for some time. He was buried in the Presbyterian section of Rookwood Cemetery.

References

1857 births
1924 deaths
Australian Labor Party members of the Parliament of Australia
Australian boilermakers
Burials at Rookwood Cemetery
Deaths from diabetes
Members of the Australian Senate for New South Wales
20th-century Australian politicians